Oberwil may refer to several places in Switzerland:

Oberwil, Basel-Country
Oberwil im Simmental,  Berne
Oberwil bei Büren,  Berne
Oberwil-Lieli, Aargau
Oberwil (Dägerlen), Zurich
Oberwil (Nürensdorf), Zurich
Oberwil (Pfäffikon), Pfäffikon, Zurich
Oberwil, Thurgau, Gachnang, Thurgau
Oberwil bei Zug,  Zug
Oberwil, St. Gallen, Waldkirch, St. Gallen